is a Japanese professional shogi player ranked 8-dan.

Shogi professional
In March 2018, Kanzaki finished the 76th Meijin Class C2 league (April 2017March 2018) with a record of 2 wins and 8 losses, earning a second consecutive demotion point which meant he was only one point away from automatic demotion to "Free Class" play. As a result, he declared his intention to the Japan Shogi Association to become a Free Class player as of April 2018 rather than risk automatic demotion.

On August 2, 2022, Kanzaki defeated Tomoki Yokoyama 4-dan in 64th Ōi tournament play to become the 58th shogi professional to win 600 games.

Promotion history
The promotion history for Kanzaki is as follows:
 7-kyū: 1977
 1-dan: 1980
 4-dan: November 5, 1986
 5-dan: April 24, 1990
 6-dan: May 24, 1994
 7-dan: May 29, 2001
 8-dan: August 15, 2016

Awards and honors
Kanzaki received the JSA's "25 Years Service Award" in recognition of being an active professional for twenty-five years in 2011. In addition, he received the JSA's "Shogi Honor Award" in August 2022 for winning 600 games as a professional.

References

External links
 ShogiHub: Kanzaki, Kenji

Japanese shogi players
Living people
Professional shogi players
Professional shogi players from Wakayama Prefecture
People from Wakayama (city)
1963 births